Little frog may refer to:

 Little grass frog (Pseudacris ocularis) a frog in the family Hylidae endemic to the Southeastern United States
 Little spiny frog (Quasipaa exilispinosa), a frog in the family Dicroglossidae found in southern China including Hong Kong
 Taiwan little pygmy frog (Micryletta steinegeri), a frog in the family Microhylidae endemic to central and southern Taiwan
 Little Frog Mountain, a mountain in Tennessee, United States

See also

 Little red frog (disambiguation)

Animal common name disambiguation pages